Aspire Zone, also known as Doha Sports City, is a  sporting complex located in the Baaya district of Al Rayyan, a suburb of Doha, Qatar. Owned by the Aspire Zone Foundation, it was established as an international sports destination in 2003 and in the following year an educational centre for the development of sporting champions (Aspire Academy) was opened. The complex contains several sporting venues, mostly constructed in preparation for the 2006 Asian Games.

Aspire Zone is also home to Doha's tallest structure, the Aspire Tower, and is adjacent to Villaggio Mall, the most popular mall in Qatar.

The complex is an important feature in the 2022 FIFA World Cup bid submitted by the Qatar Football Association, and was central to the Doha bid for the 2016 Summer Olympics put forward by the Qatar Olympic Committee.

Sporting venues
Aspire Zone's sporting venues include:
 Khalifa International Stadium, a 50,000-capacity stadium primarily used for football matches.
 Hamad Aquatic Center, an Olympic-size swimming pool.
 The Aspire Dome, which is the world's largest indoor multi-purpose sports hall and contains 13 different playing fields.

Aspire Academy
Aspire Academy, a sporting academy for youth, is located in the center of Aspire Zone.

Aspetar
Aspetar, a specialised orthopaedic and sports medicine hospital, is among the facilities of Aspire Zone. Commencing operations in 2007, it was the first-ever sports medicine hospital in the Middle East region. It earned accreditation as a FIFA Medical Centre of Excellence in 2009. The hospital publishes a journal entitled Aspetar Sports Medicine Journal.

References

External links
 

Sports venues in Doha
Event venues established in 2003
2003 establishments in Qatar
Aspire Academy